"Strange Thing" may refer to:

Music
"Strange Thing", single by Buzzcocks Shelley, 1980
"Strange Thing", song by John Holt, 1971
"Strange Thing (Mystifying)" by Murray Head, 1970
"Strange Thing", song by Oasis from Live Demonstration

See also
Strange Things, 1990 album by Tackhead
Stranger Things (disambiguation)